Nipigon is a township in Thunder Bay District, Northwestern Ontario, Canada, located along the west side of the Nipigon River and south of the small Lake Helen running between Lake Nipigon and Lake Superior. Located at latitude 49.0125° N, Nipigon is the northernmost community on the North shore of Lake Superior.

Nipigon is served by several transportation corridors:

 Highway 11
 Highway 17, both part of the Trans-Canada Highway
 Canadian Pacific Railway

Geography

For about 15 km, Highway 11 runs within Nipigon River and a lake.  Nipigon is located northeast of Thunder Bay, southwest of Geraldton and Beardmore, west of Marathon and northwest of Sault Ste. Marie. The crater on Mars named Nipigon Crater or Crater Nipigon is named after this town.

Nipigon is surrounded with pine and other varieties of forests.  The power line connecting from Lake Nipigon supplies electricity to Thunder Bay and area.  The other power line runs between Thunder Bay and the rest of Ontario. Timbering has been common sporadically to the north, the northwest and further north within Lake Nipigon along with parts of the southwest which formed old forest roads to the northeast and north. The municipality of Greenstone lies to the north. A manufacturing plant lies to the south.  Several other unincorporated municipalities were around Nipigon. A communications tower near Nipigon broadcasts a local radio station and television channels from Thunder Bay including CKPR (TBT), CFNO and CBQT.

There are two bridges at the east end of town spanning the Nipigon River: one is a single-track railway bridge belonging to the Canadian Pacific Railway, and the other is a two-lane highway bridge constructed by the Province of Ontario. With the exception of the Canadian National Railway transcontinental rail line, the two bridges are the narrowest east-west land link in Canada's transportation system. Both Highways 11 and 17 and the Canadian Pacific Railway route all their traffic across those bridges.

The Nipigon River Bridge is a pair of two-lane cable-stayed bridges, the first of their kind in Ontario, replacing the 1937 bridge. On January 10, 2016, the first bridge heaved apart but did not collapse, resulting in traffic having to reroute through the United States. However, one lane was re-opened to traffic 17 hours later.

Demographics

Economy

The chief industries in Nipigon are forest products, fishing, and tourism.

Nipigon is a setting off point for fishing excursions onto Lake Superior and the Nipigon River system leading up to Lake Nipigon.  Fish varieties common to this area  include Atlantic salmon, lake trout, speckled trout (the world's largest speckled trout was caught in the Nipigon River in 1915, weighing in at ), rainbow trout, walleye, northern pike, bass, and perch.

Mill fire

On February 6, 2007, a devastating fire ripped through Multiply Forest Products, burning the mill to the ground.
The mill was the main employer in the town. Less than a month earlier workers at the mill had purchased it from Columbia Forest Products of Portland, Oregon. At the time of the sale, a $4-million modernization plan for the mill was also announced. More than 100 people were employed at the plant, which produced hardwood underlayment for vinyl, plywood and laminate flooring.

Notable people from Nipigon

Nipigon was the birthplace of two time world curling champion Allan A. "Al" (the Iceman) Hackner. Hackner won The Brier in 1982 and 1985.

Recreation 
Nipigon and the surrounding area boast a wide array of outdoor recreational activities for all times of the year. A select number of cliffs in the Nipigon area are being developed into rock climbing destinations. More information can be found in the Thunder Bay Climbing guidebook.

See also

List of townships in Ontario

References

External links

Hudson's Bay Company trading posts
Municipalities in Thunder Bay District
Single-tier municipalities in Ontario
Township municipalities in Ontario
Populated places on Lake Superior in Canada